Qatar Qui (also Romanized as Qaţār Qū’ī; also known as Ghatar Ghoo’ī, Qatar Koī, and Qaţar Qūyū) is a village in Gol Tappeh Rural District, Gol Tappeh District, Kabudarahang County, Hamadan Province, Iran. At the 2006 census, its population was 1,000, in 222 families.

References 

Populated places in Kabudarahang County